The 2015 FIA World Rally Championship-2 is the third season of the World Rally Championship-2, an auto racing championship recognized by the Fédération Internationale de l'Automobile, running in support of the World Rally Championship. It was created when the Group R class of rally car was introduced in 2013. The Championship is open to cars complying with R4, R5, and Super 2000 regulations. The Championship is composed by thirteen Rallies, and Drivers and Teams must nominate a maximum of seven event. The best six results are counted towards the championship.

Nasser Al-Attiyah is the defending champion, as he won the 2014 title by just three points.

Calendar

Regulation changes

 In the WRC 2 and WRC 3 Championships for Teams, only the best placed car in a team will be taken into account for points.
  A car which has not started from the start line within 20 seconds will be considered as retired and will be able to restart under Rally 2 on the subsequent day.
 The transmission of performance data or information to or from a competing car, not in relation with safety, is forbidden during special stages to help promote greater competition.

Teams and drivers

Rally summaries

Results and standings

Points are awarded to the top ten classified finishers.

FIA World Rally Championship-2 for Drivers

FIA World Rally Championship-2 for Co-Drivers

FIA World Rally Championship-2 for Teams

FIA World Rally Championship-2 for Production Car Drivers

FIA World Rally Championship-2 for Production Car Co-Drivers

References

External links
Official website of the World Rally Championship
Official website of the Fédération Internationale de l'Automobile

 
World Rally Championship 2